Thomas Stephens (August 29, 1935 – July 12, 2018) was a professional American football player who played tight end for five seasons for the Boston Patriots of the American Football League (AFL).

References

1935 births
2018 deaths
American football tight ends
Boston Patriots players
Curry Colonels athletic directors
Curry Colonels football coaches
Harvard Crimson football coaches
Syracuse Orange football players
Sportspeople from Galveston, Texas
Coaches of American football from Texas
Players of American football from Texas